Kolga-Jaani Parish was a rural municipality of Estonia, in Viljandi County. It had a population of 1,668 (as of 1 January 2009) and an area of 312.35 km².

Settlements
Small borough
Kolga-Jaani
Villages
Eesnurga - Järtsaare - Kaavere - Lalsi - Lätkalu - Leie - Meleski - Oiu - Otiküla - Odiste - Oorgu - Parika - Taganurga - Vaibla - Vissuvere

Gallery

References

External links
Official website